Farm to Market Road 359 (FM 359) is a state highway in the U.S. state of Texas. The highway begins at U.S. Route 90 Alternate (US 90A) near Richmond in Fort Bend County. FM 359 heads in a northwesterly direction through Pecan Grove and Fulshear to Interstate 10 at Brookshire in Waller County. Continuing to the northwest, the highway passes through the small communities of Pattison, Monaville and Pine Island before ending at U.S. Route 290 (US 290) and Texas Highway 6 (SH 6) east of Hempstead.

Route description
This intersection is just north of John and Randolph Foster High School in Lamar Consolidated Independent School District. After proceeding northwest, FM 359 passes through the rural community of Foster and turns in a northerly direction. The highway passes Hines Nurseries Inc., briefly veers west at Fulshear-Gaston Road, and turns north before reaching the intersection of FM 1093 and FM 1463 at a traffic signal.

In this stretch, the highway shares its right-of-way with FM 1093. After  on Bains Street, there is a fork where FM 362 splits off to the north while FM 359 heads to the northwest. After an additional , FM 359 ends at a limited access highway interchange with US 290 and SH 6 to the east of Hempstead.

History
On the same day, the order was amended to extend the highway northwest through Brookshire to SH 6 southeast of Hempstead. On September 26, 1945, FM 359 was extended west to US 290 near Hempstead. On August 1, 1947 the section from Richmond south to Thompsons was canceled. (The canceled section is the 2010 route of FM 762 and FM 2759.)

Major intersections

Gallery

See also

References

0359
Transportation in Fort Bend County, Texas
Transportation in Waller County, Texas